Alon Badat (born December 3, 1989) is an Israeli footballer who plays with FC Ukraine United in the Canadian Soccer League. He played college soccer for York University, with whom he was a U Sports Championship All Star, the Ontario University Athletics (OUA) West Rookie of the Year, and Bradley University in Illinois. He has also played professional soccer with Ironi Kiryat Ata F.C., the North York Astros, Portugal FC/SC Toronto, Scarborough SC, and Vaughan Azzurri. He won a bronze medal with Team Canada at the 2013 Maccabiah Games in Jerusalem, Israel.

Early life
Badat was born in Israel, and moved to Canada at 10 years of age. For high school he attended Westmount Collegiate Institute in Thornhill, Ontario, Canada. His hometown is Thornhill.

Career 
After having spent some time with the youth system of Canadian ANB Futbol, in 2007, at 17 years of age, Badat joined the youth system of Israeli Maccabi Netanya F.C. He later played in the Liga Leumit with Ironi Kiryat Ata F.C., where he appeared in four matches. In 2009, he played in the Canadian Soccer League with North York Astros.

At the conclusion of the season he enrolled to play college soccer with the York Lions in Toronto, Canada. During his tenure with York University, where he studied finance, in 2010 he was named a U Sports Championship All Star, the Ontario University Athletics (OUA) West Rookie of the Year, and an OUA West Second-Team All-Star. He tied for third in the OUA West in scoring, with 9 goals in 14 games. In 2011 he was a First-Team OUA all-star and Second-Team CIS U Sports All-Canadian, and was second in the OUA with 14 goals in 14 games.

In 2012, he transferred to Bradley University in Peoria, Illinois, to play with Bradley Braves. During the college off-season he played in the CSL with SC Toronto, where in 2011 he won the regular season title. In 2013 he was MVC Men's Soccer Second Team All-Conference.

In 2016, he played in Canada with Scarborough SC, and finished off the season in League1 Ontario with Vaughan Azzurri. The following season he played in the CSL Second Division with FC Ukraine United.

International
He played for Team Canada at the 2013 Maccabiah Games in Jerusalem, Israel, winning a bronze medal.

Awards

Jewish Sports Review All-America First Team: 2013
NSCAA Scholar All-North/Central Region Second Team: 2013
All-Missouri Valley Conference (MVC) 2nd Team: 2013
MVC Offensive Player of the Week: Oct. 21, 2013
UNLV Nike Invitational All-Tournament Team: 2013
MVC Honor Roll:  2014

References

External links
"Alon Badat," Israel Football Association

1989 births
Living people
Association football midfielders
Canadian soccer players
Expatriate soccer players in Canada
Israeli footballers
Israeli expatriate footballers
Ironi Kiryat Ata players
Israeli expatriate sportspeople in Canada
Jewish Canadian sportspeople
Jewish footballers
Maccabiah Games bronze medalists for Canada
Maccabiah Games medalists in football
Competitors at the 2013 Maccabiah Games
North York Astros players
People from Thornhill, Ontario
SC Toronto players
Scarborough SC players
FC Ukraine United players
Liga Leumit players
Canadian Soccer League (1998–present) players
York Lions soccer players
Bradley Braves men's soccer players
Vaughan Azzurri players